John Basil Lee Jellicoe (5 February 1899 – 24 August 1935) was a priest in the Church of England best known for his work as a housing reformer.

Jellicoe was born in Chailey, Sussex and educated at Haileybury and Imperial Service College. A graduate of Magdalen College, Oxford, he later studied at St. Stephen's House, Oxford and was ordained as an Anglican priest and became Missioner at the Magdalen College Mission run by the College in the parish of St Mary's Church in Somers Town, London., then an area of exceptional overcrowding and poverty between Euston and St Pancras main line railway stations. He was founder of the St Pancras Housing Association (originally the St Pancras House Improvement Society) and several other housing associations in East London, St Marylebone, Kensington, Sussex and Cornwall. He toured the country in his small car fundraising and selling loan stock to fund these projects. His father, Thomas Harry Lee Jellicoe, rector of St Peter's Chailey, was a cousin of John Jellicoe, 1st Earl Jellicoe.

Jellicoe died in Uxbridge on 24 August 1935. A plaque was unveiled in his honour in Camden in 2014. He is commemorated in the Diocese of London with a memorial day on 24 August. The annual Jellicoe Sermon at Magdalen College is named in his honour.

A video of Jellicoe interacting with Londoners in a pub in 1930 is available online through the University of South Carolina Library's digital archive.

Notes

Sources
Dictionary of National Biography entry
The Jellicoe Society

People from Lewes District
20th-century English Anglican priests
History of the London Borough of Camden
Housing reformers
1899 births
1935 deaths
Anglo-Catholic clergy
English Anglo-Catholics
People educated at Haileybury and Imperial Service College